Ben and Me is a 1953 American animated two-reel short subject produced by Walt Disney Productions and released theatrically on November 10, 1953. It was adapted from the children's book written by author/illustrator Robert Lawson and first published in 1939. Though both book and film deal with the relationship between a mouse and American Founding Father Benjamin Franklin, the book, with illustrations by Lawson, focused more heavily on actual historical events and personages, and included incidents from Franklin's French career at Versailles.

The short received an Academy Award nomination for Best Short Subject, Two-reel.

This short was also notable for being the second release on the Buena Vista Distribution label, with the first being Toot, Whistle, Plunk and Boom, released on the same day. On its release, Ben and Me was packaged with the True-Life Adventure documentary The Living Desert. When Disney's regular distributor RKO Radio Pictures resisted the idea of a full-length True-Life Adventure, Disney formed his own distribution company to handle future Disney releases.

In DTV, the short was set to Stevie Wonder's For Once in My Life.

Plot
At a statue of Benjamin Franklin, the leader of a tour group of mice reveals the contributions of a mouse named Amos to Franklin's career, reading from Amos' diary, titled Ben and Me. After describing the exploits of some of his ancestors, Amos tells his own story: The eldest of 26 siblings living in the Christ Church, Philadelphia, he sets out on his own in 1745 to find work. Having no luck, he takes shelter in Ben's shop and befriends the beleaguered printer. Amos invents bifocals for Ben and inspires him to create the Franklin stove. Amos also helps Ben turn his dry publication, Poor Richard's Almanack, into a successful newspaper, the Pennsylvania Gazette; Amos acts as journalist and helps Ben operate the printing press. As the years pass, Amos helps Ben advance socially and build his reputation.

Ben makes Amos an unwitting test subject in his experiments with electricity, sending him into the air as part of his kite experiment. Amos is nearly killed when the kite is struck by lightning and crashes to the ground. Furious, he leaves Ben and moves back in with his family.

Years later, during the early stages of the American Revolution, Ben is sent to England to try to reason with the king, but the mission is a failure. In 1776, Ben begs Amos for help. Amos agrees on the condition that Ben sign a contract agreeing to his terms. As Ben is reading the contract, Thomas Jefferson comes by, struggling with writing the introduction to the United States Declaration of Independence. The language in Amos' contract inspires Jefferson, and becomes the Declaration's introduction. Amos accompanies Ben to the signing of the Declaration.

Voice cast
Sterling Holloway as Amos Mouse
Charlie Ruggles as Benjamin Franklin
Stan Freberg as mouse guide
Bill Thompson as Governor Keith, and as the human tour guide
Hans Conried as Thomas Jefferson, and as a criminal
Jimmy MacDonald as miscellaneous men

Home media
The short was released on December 6, 2005 on Walt Disney Treasures: Disney Rarities - Celebrated Shorts: 1920s–1960s.

Additional releases include:
On VHS under the Walt Disney Mini-Classics label in 1989
On DVD in 2012 under the Disney Generations Collection

References

External links
 
 
 
 "Ben and Me" at Don Markstein's Toonopedia. Archived from the original on April 4, 2012.

1953 short films
Works about Benjamin Franklin
1950s Disney animated short films
Animated films about animals
Animated films about mice
American Revolutionary War films
Films set in Pennsylvania
Films set in Philadelphia
Films set in the Thirteen Colonies
1953 animated films
Films directed by Hamilton Luske
Films produced by Walt Disney
Films scored by Oliver Wallace
Films set in 1745
Films set in 1776
Cultural depictions of Benjamin Franklin
Cultural depictions of Thomas Jefferson
Secret histories
Animated films based on children's books
Animation based on real people
1950s English-language films
American animated short films
Films with screenplays by Winston Hibler